Ninčić is a surname. Notable people with the surname include:

Momčilo Ninčić (1876–1949), Serbian and Yugoslav politician and economist
Stefan Ninčić (born 1991), Serbian football player

Serbian surnames